Rockland Osgood (born February 27, 1958, Montgomery, Alabama) is a contemporary American lyric tenor who has distinguished himself in a wide variety of musical idioms from the Baroque to the latest in Contemporary compositions. He is frequently praised for his exemplary musicianship, eloquence of expression, and immaculate diction.

Education

He received a B.A. from  Huntingdon College followed by a master's degree from the New England Conservatory of Music.  He was a Fellow at the Berkshire Music Center at Tanglewood and was a winner of the New York Oratorio Society Solo Competition as well as the National Association of Teachers of Singing Competition.

Career

Mr. Osgood has performed with many musical organizations including the Boston Symphony Orchestra, Emmanuel Music of Boston, Handel and Haydn Society, the Sioux City Symphony, the Jacksonville Symphony, Oregon Symphony, Boston Cecilia, Cantata Singers, Spectrum Singers, Chorus pro Musica, Spoleto Festival, North Carolina Symphony, Anchorage Opera, Mobile Opera, Brevard Music Center, Syracuse Opera, Boston Camerata, New York Choral Society, Oregon Symphony, and is a frequent soloist at the Northwest Bach Festival.  Conductors include Seiji Ozawa, Gunther Schuller, James DePreist, Joel Revzen, David Hoose, Craig Smith, Kent Tritle, Michael Kleinschmidt, and John Rutter.

Mr. Osgood toured nationally with the Boston Camerata and includes in his repertoire such singular works as Distler's Weihnachtsgeschichte and Albert's Into Eclipse. He was a featured soloist with the New York Choral Society on their 1985 tour of Greece.  He was soloist in the World Premiere of Richard Emery's Death at Wallowa Valley and Donald Sur’s Slavery Documents. In 2008, he performed the world premiere of  Lior Navok's Slavery Documents 3: And the trains kept coming...  with Cantata Singers. He recently performed St. John Passion (Evangelist) at Trinity Church, Boston.

Repertoire
 Bach:  St. John Passion, St. Matthew Passion, b minor Mass, Magnificat
 Beethoven: Missa Solemnis, Mass in C
 Berg:  Wozzeck
 Bernstein:  Chichester Psalms
 Britten:  War Requiem, St. Nicholas, Cantata Misericordia 
 Distler:  Weihnachtsgeschichte
 Handel:  Messiah, Saul
 Haydn:  Creation 
 Mozart:  Tamino Die Zauberflöte, Belmonte Die Entfuehrung aus dem Serail, Almaviva Il Barbiere di Siviglia, Don Ottavio Don Giovanni, Mass in c-minor
 Mendelssohn:  Paulus, Symphony #2
 Navok:  Slavery Documents 3:  And the trains kept coming
 Orff:  Carmina Burana
 Pinkham:  St. Mark Passion
 Rossini:  Messe di Gloria
 Stravinsky:  Les Noces
 Sur:  Slavery Documents
 Verdi:  Requiem
 Vivaldi: Arsilda, Regina di Ponto

Reviews
"The soloist that left me consistently amazed was Osgood. His part includes the demanding role of the narrating Evangelist who sings near the top of the tenor register, as well as arias that show a remarkable range of emotion. Osgood seemed as fresh in his furious finale (``With fear the blackguard is all shaken'') aria as he had been two hours earlier in his aria urging the shepherds to hasten to Christ's manger."
Travis Rivers, The Spokesman Review - February 3, 2003

"Osgood, who has a growing national and international reputation as a baroque specialist, gave a brilliant performance from the very first aria 'Every valley shall be exalted'  Of the four singers, his ornamentation was the furthest and freshest departure from what singers usually do with the music."
Ann Le Bar, The Spokesman Review - March 4, 2001

References 
New York Times:  Boston Camerata 'L'Orfeo'

External links
 
Recordings
Sapphire Summer
Emmanuel Music
Baroque Music for Christmas (track 10)

American operatic tenors
Huntingdon College alumni
New England Conservatory alumni
Living people
1958 births
Musicians from Montgomery, Alabama